Constant Priondolo (born 10 September 1959) is an Italian ice hockey player. He competed in the men's tournament at the 1984 Winter Olympics.

References

External links

1959 births
Living people
HC Alleghe players
HC Milano players
Ice hockey players at the 1984 Winter Olympics
Italian ice hockey players
Laval National players
Montreal Juniors players
Olympic ice hockey players of Italy
SHC Fassa players
Ice hockey people from Montreal